This uniform polyhedron compound is a composition of 5 stellated truncated hexahedra, formed by star-truncating each of the cubes in the compound of 5 cubes.

Cartesian coordinates 
Cartesian coordinates for the vertices of this compound are all the cyclic permutations of

 (±(2−), ±, ±(2−))
 (±φ, ±(φ−1−φ−1), ±(2φ−1−φ))
 (±1, ±(φ−2+φ−1), ±(φ2−φ))
 (±(1−), ±(−φ−2+), ±(φ2−))
 (±(φ−φ), ±(−φ−1), ±(2φ−1−φ−1))

where φ = (1+)/2 is the golden ratio.

References 
.

Polyhedral compounds